The Paeroa Fault is a seismically active area in the Taupō District, Waikato Region of the central North Island of New Zealand.

Geology
This fault area of the Taupo Rift is displacing at a rate of 7.2 ± 0.4 mm/yr. At the north eastern end of the fault is the geothermally active Maungaongaonga volcano that with the fault defines the far south western border of the Ōkataina Volcanic Centre. The Ngapouri-Rotomahana Fault too extends to the Ōkataina Caldera and is a splay from the Paeroa Fault.

The southern portion of the fault is associated with the raised Paeroa Fault block immediately to its east which is the largest ground surface fault block within the Taupō Volcanic Zone. The raised block further to the east goes into the down lands associated with the Reporoa Caldera that extend to form the Taupo-Reporoa Basin. To the west is the adjacent Te Weta Fault block in what has been called the Paeroa Garben, a rift valley that extends to the much more inactive now Horohoro Fault.

Risks
This intra-rift fault has been estimated to have single event earthquakes in its northern portion about 6.4 Mw and for the whole fault, rupture intensity of about 6.8 Mw with up to  upward displacement. Almost half of rupture events in the last 16,000 years have been associated with nearby volcanic eruptions so it is not only the direct earthquake impact that may be important.  The Mamaku eruption of about 8000 years ago and Rotoma eruption of about 9500 years ago of the Ōkataina Caldera are associated in time with deposits indicating the earthquake fault rupture events took place either just before or during the eruption sequence.

References

Seismic faults of New Zealand
Taupō Volcanic Zone
Okataina Volcanic Centre